Lotilaner, sold under the brand name Credelio, is a veterinary medication used to control fleas and ticks in dogs and cats.  It is indicated for the treatment and prevention of flea infestations (Ctenocephalides felis) and for the treatment and control of tick infestations including lone star tick (Amblyomma americanum), American dog tick (Dermacentor variabilis), black-legged tick (Ixodes scapularis), and brown dog tick (Rhipicephalus sanguineus).

Lotilaner in combination with milbemycin oxime is sold under the brand name Credelio Plus. It is used in dogs to treat concurrent infestations with parasites living outside (ticks and/or fleas) and inside (worms) the animal's body.

References

External links 
 

Insecticides
Acaricides
Cat medications
Chloroarenes
Dog medications
Trifluoromethyl compounds
Thiophenes
Isoxazolines